The Kamboi Eagles Football Club commonly known as Kamboi Eagles, is a Sierra Leonean football club based in Kenema City, Sierra Leone, currently a member of the Sierra Leone National Premier League, the highest division of football league in Sierra Leone. The Eagles have an intense rivalry with the Diamond Stars of Kono and cross-regional rival Bo Rangers.

The Eagles play their home games at the Kenema City Field in Kenema City and have trice won the Sierra Leonean FA Cup, in 1981,1985 and 2014.

Sierra Leonean international footballer Paul Kpaka started his career with Kamboi Eagles before moving to Europe.

19th Oct 2022, Ahead of Sierra Leone’s Premier League Season the Management of Kamboi Eagles FC has
confirmed the appointment of former player Alimu Koroma (System) as their New Head Coach for two seasons after
replacing Francis Zappa Koroma who left the club a few months ago.

Achievements
Sierra Leonean FA Cup: 3
 1981, 1985, 2014.

Performance in CAF competitions
CAF Confederation Cup: 1 appearance
2015 – Preliminary Round

CAF Cup: 1 appearance
1993 – withdrew in First Round

CAF Cup Winners' Cup: 2 appearances
1982 – First Round
1986 – disqualified in First Round

References 

Football clubs in Sierra Leone
Kenema